The 1995–96 season was Paris Saint-Germain's 26th season in existence. PSG played their home league games at the Parc des Princes in Paris, registering an average attendance of 37,353 spectators per match. The club was presided by Michel Denisot and the team was coached by Luis Fernandez. Bernard Lama was the team captain.

Players 
As of the 1995–96 season.

Squad

Out on loan

Transfers 

As of the 1995–96 season.

Arrivals

Departures

Kits 

German automobile manufacturer Opel was the shirt sponsor. American sportswear brand Nike was the kit manufacturer.

Competitions

Overview

Trophée des Champions

Division 1

League table

Results by round

Matches

Coupe de France

Coupe de la Ligue

UEFA Cup Winners' Cup

First round

Second round

Quarter-finals

Semi-finals

Final

Statistics

As of the 1995–96 season.

Appearances and goals

|-
!colspan="16" style="background:#dcdcdc; text-align:center"|Goalkeepers

|-
!colspan="16" style="background:#dcdcdc; text-align:center"|Defenders

|-
!colspan="16" style="background:#dcdcdc; text-align:center"|Midfielders

|-
!colspan="16" style="background:#dcdcdc; text-align:center"|Forwards

|-
!colspan="16" style="background:#dcdcdc; text-align:center"|Players transferred / loaned out during the season

|-

References

External links 

Official websites
 PSG.FR - Site officiel du Paris Saint-Germain
 Paris Saint-Germain - Ligue 1 
 Paris Saint-Germain - UEFA.com

Paris Saint-Germain F.C. seasons
Paris Saint-Germain
UEFA Cup Winners' Cup-winning seasons